The Pinaire Ultra-Aire is an American ultralight aircraft that was designed and produced by Pinaire Engineering. The aircraft was supplied as a kit for amateur construction.

Design and development
It features a cable-braced high-wing, canard elevator, a single-seat, open cockpit, tricycle landing gear and a single engine in pusher configuration.

The aircraft is made from bolted-together aluminum tubing, with its flying surfaces covered in Dacron sailcloth. Its compact single-surface  span wing is supported by cables attached to a simple tube kingpost. The pilot is accommodated on a suspended sling seat. The control system is two-axis with pitch controlled by a canard elevator attached to the side-stick. Roll and yaw are controlled by wing tip rudders also controlled by the side-stick. The landing gear features a steerable nose wheel, also controlled by the side-stick.

The aircraft was carefully tested using sandbag loading to +6 and -4 g without failure. Reviewer Andre Cliche describes the design as "well engineered". The Ultra-Aire can be quickly dismantled for ground transportation or storage.

Specifications (Ultra-Aire)

See also

References

External links
Photo of sales brochure

1980s United States ultralight aircraft
Homebuilt aircraft
Single-engined pusher aircraft
Canard aircraft
High-wing aircraft